Kali Charan Inter College is one of the oldest schools in old Lucknow. It is situated near Imambara on Hardoi Road. The college is recognized for the study of Arts, Commerce and Science streams.

History
This college was established in 1913 by Babu Ganga Prashad Verma with the financial support of Lala Kali Charan Khatri. On 16 March 1914, it was inaugurated by the then governor of the united province, Sir James Scorgio Mastin.

Before independence, the college was known as Kali Charan High School. From 1946 to 1947 it was recognized up to the intermediate level by U.P. Board. In 1973 it was upgraded to Kali Charan Degree College. This college has illustrious Principals who were known for their scholarship and contribution to Hindi. The most notable among them was the first Principal Dr. Shyam Sundar Das who became the first HOD of Hindi at Banaras Hindu University, known for his immense contribution to Hindi. Following him were Kali Das Kapur and later on Shiv Shankar Verma who also made a rich contribution to Hindi in immediate Post Independence India.

Library 
The school has a grand library consisting of over 10,000 books. Monthly magazines, bulletins, and newspapers that helps to enrich and upgrade the knowledge of students and teachers.

Vocational Courses 
Vocational courses like Nursery Teachers Training, Typing and Computer are also available.

Sports facilities 
The college provides facilities for students to pursue a wide range of sporting activities on the college campus.  There are outdoor facilities for athletics, football, basketball and volleyball.

Scholarship
The college provides education to all students without tuition fee. The students with reservation applicability (SC, ST, OBC) are granted a scholarship as per government rules. Moreover, the school manages special scholarships for meritorious and economically weak students.

Alumni: Any college is known by its alumni who pay some returns to the society for whatever they have learned during their early formative years of the school. Kali Charan Inter College is no an exception. Its alumni have made a rich contribution to literature, radio, television, medical education and politics. Some of the noteworthy contributors like Lalji Tandon (former Governor of Madhya Pradesh, Minister and MP), Dr. Prof. V.K. Puri, former HOD of Cardiology KGMU Lucknow, Prof. Shridhar Dwivedi Ex Dean /Principal HIMSR, Jamia Hamdard and HOD Medicine  / Preventive Cardiology, UCMS - Delhi University to name a few.

Temple 
An ancient temple dedicated to Goddess Saraswati is just inside the college campus. The temple provides the spiritual environment to students, teachers and members alike. Many festivals are celebrated with traditional gaiety in the temple.

Managements
The districts magistrate of Lucknow holds the ex-officio post of chairman of college managing committee. Besides the other renowned personalities, D.I.O.S of Lucknow is among the members of the managing committee.

References
Official documentation of school

Schools in Lucknow
Intermediate colleges in Uttar Pradesh
Educational institutions established in 1913
1913 establishments in India